Presidential Mission is the eighth novel in Upton Sinclair's Lanny Budd series. First published by Viking Press in 1947, the story covers the period from 1942 to 1943.

Plot

References

1947 American novels
American historical novels
Novels by Upton Sinclair
Fiction set in 1942
Fiction set in 1943
Viking Press books